Crixás do Tocantins is a municipality located in the Brazilian state of Tocantins. Its population was 1,735 (2020) and its area is 987 km².

References

Municipalities in Tocantins